Saint John of Choziba, originally known as John of Thebes, was a monk who was born in Egypt around the year 440–450 CE. He abandoned monophysitism around 480 and moved to Wadi Qelt, a wadi in the Judaean Desert, where he reorganized the existing lavra into a monastery known as the monastery of Choziba. In 516, he became Bishop of Caesarea, but soon resigned and returned to the monastery of Choziba, where he died between 520 and 530. 

He has been canonised as Saint John of Choziba.

References

440s births
520s deaths
5th-century Byzantine monks
6th-century Byzantine monks
5th-century Egyptian people
6th-century Egyptian people
6th-century Syrian bishops
6th-century Christian saints
Saints from the Holy Land
Bishops of Caesarea